Taste is a chain supermarket in Hong Kong owned by AS Watson, a wholly owned subsidiary of Hutchison Whampoa Limited. It opened its first branch in Festival Walk, Kowloon Tong in 2004, but most of the branches are opened based on the re-decoration of Park'n Shop, Taste's sister company. Its main customers are middle-class families. Its retail products are similar to those in ParknShop and Great.

Locations
 Amoy Plaza (Ngau Tau Kok)
 Nova Mall (Macau)
 Citimall (Yuen Long)
 Festival Walk (Kowloon Tong)
 Citygate (Tung Chung)
 We Go Mall (Ma On Shan)
 Hopewell Centre (Wan Chai)
 East Point City (Hang Hau) (closed in 2016)
 Maritime Square (Tsing Yi)
 Olympian City 2 (Tai Kok Tsui)
 Metroplaza (Kwai Fong, Kwai Chung)
 TMTplaza (Tuen Mun)
 Celestial Heights (Ho Man Tin)
 Ma On Shan Plaza (Ma On Shan）
 China Plaza (Guangzhou)
 Luoxi New Town Ruyi Square (Guangzhou)
 Grandview Mall (Guangzhou)
 Gubei Rd (Shanghai)
 Kingglory Plaza (Shenzhen)
 Huafa Mall (Zhuhai)
 Raffles City (Shenzhen)
 Raffles City (Chengdu)

See others
Park'n Shop
Great (supermarket)
Gourmet (supermarket)

References

Retail companies established in 2004
2004 establishments in Hong Kong
Department stores of Hong Kong
Supermarkets of Hong Kong
AS Watson